Hasselt dialect or Hasselt Limburgish (natively ,) is the city dialect and variant of Limburgish spoken in the Belgian city of Hasselt alongside the Dutch language. All of its speakers are bilingual with standard Dutch.

Phonology

Consonants

 Obstruents are devoiced word-finally. However, when the next word starts with a vowel and is pronounced without a pause, both voiced and voiceless word-final obstruents are realized as voiced.
  are bilabial, whereas  are labiodental.
 In the palatal sequences , the affricates tend to be realized as palatalized stops.
  is often dropped, though this is not marked in transcriptions in this article.

Realization of 

There are also a few speakers who mix uvular and alveolar articulations.

Among uvular articulations, he lists uvular trill , uvular fricative trill , uvular fricative  and uvular approximant , which are used more or less equally often in all contexts. Almost all speakers with a uvular  use all four of these realizations.

Among alveolar articulations, he lists alveolar tap , voiced alveolar fricative , alveolar approximant , voiceless alveolar trill , alveolar tapped or trilled fricative , voiceless alveolar tap  and voiceless alveolar fricative . Among these, the tap is most common, whereas the tapped/trilled fricative is the second most common realization.

Elsewhere in the article, the consonant is transcribed  for the sake of consistency with IPA transcriptions of other dialects of Limburgish.

Vowels

As in about 50 other dialects spoken in Belgian Limburg, the rounded front vowels  have largely been replaced with their unrounded counterparts  and are mostly restricted to loanwords from French. The marginal diphthong  occurs only in loanwords from French and interjections.  is also rare, and like  occurs only in the word-final position.
 Phonetically,  is near-front .
 All of the back vowels are almost fully back. Among these,  and the non-native  are rounded, whereas  are unrounded.
 Before alveolar consonants, the long monophthongs  and the diphthongs  are realized as centering diphthongs . The distinction between a long monophthong and a centering diphthong is only phonemic in the case of the  pair, as exemplified by the minimal pair   'broad' vs.   'plank'.
  are mid .
  occurs only in unstressed syllables.
  is near-open, whereas  are open.
The latter diphthong occurs only in the word-final position.

An example word for the sequence  is   'unwillingly'.

Stress and tone

The location of stress is the same as in Belgian Standard Dutch. In compound nouns, the stress is sometimes shifted to the second element (the head noun), as in stadhäös  'town hall'. Loanwords from French sometimes preserve the original final stress.

As many other Limburgish dialects, the Hasselt dialect features a phonemic pitch accent, a distinction between the 'push tone' and the 'dragging tone'. It can be assumed that the latter is a lexical low tone, whereas the former is lexically toneless. Examples of words differing only by pitch accent include   'hen' vs.   'them' as well as   'mountains' vs.   'mountain'. Phonetically, the push tone rises then falls, whereas the dragging tone falls, then rises, then falls again. This phonetic realization of pitch accent is called Rule 0 by Björn Köhnlein. Elsewhere in the article, the broad transcription  is used even in phonetic transcription.

A unique feature of this dialect is that all stressed syllables can bear either of the accents, even the CVC syllables with a non-sonorant coda. In compounds, all combinations of pitch accent are possible:   'Old Street',   'Fish Market',   'Oak Street' and   'Fruit Market'.

Sample
The sample text is a reading of the first sentence of The North Wind and the Sun. 
"The north wind and the sun were discussing which of the two of them was the strongest. Just then someone came past who had a thick, warm, winter coat on."

Phonetic transcription:

Orthographic version:

References

Bibliography

Further reading

 
 

Hasselt
Languages of Belgium
Limburg (Belgium)
Low Franconian languages
West Limburgish dialects
Germanic phonologies